Radnaasediin Amgaased (born 25 October 1952) is a Mongolian weightlifter. He competed in the men's lightweight event at the 1972 Summer Olympics.

References

External links

1952 births
Living people
Mongolian male weightlifters
Olympic weightlifters of Mongolia
Weightlifters at the 1972 Summer Olympics
Place of birth missing (living people)
Weightlifters at the 1974 Asian Games
Asian Games competitors for Mongolia
20th-century Mongolian people